The European Parliament election of 1999 took place on 13 June 1999.

Forza Italia was by far the largest party in Veneto with 26.0%, while the Bonino List came surprisingly second with 11.9% (3.2% over the national average).

Results

* = In alliance with Lega per l'Autonomia – Alleanza Lombarda, the Sardinian Action Party and Union for South Tyrol at the national level.Source: Regional Council of Veneto

Elections in Veneto
1999 elections in Italy
European Parliament elections in Italy
1999 European Parliament election